Lunner Station is located on the Gjøvik Line at Lunner in Norway. The railway station was opened on 20 December 1900.

External links 

  Entry at Jernbaneverket 
 Entry at the Norwegian Railway Club 

Railway stations in Lunner
Railway stations on the Gjøvik Line
Railway stations opened in 1900
1900 establishments in Norway